Manon Lescaut is an Italian-language opera in four acts composed by Giacomo Puccini between 1889 and 1892 to a libretto by Luigi Illica, Marco Praga and , based on the 1731 novel Histoire du Chevalier des Grieux, et de Manon Lescaut by the Abbé Prévost. The opera was first performed  in 1893 in Turin, at the Teatro Regio.

Composition history 

The libretto is in Italian, and was cobbled together by five librettists whom Puccini employed: Ruggero Leoncavallo, Marco Praga, Giuseppe Giacosa,  and Luigi Illica. The publisher, Giulio Ricordi, and the composer himself also contributed to the libretto. So confused was the authorship of the libretto that no one was credited on the title page of the original score. However, it was Illica and Giacosa who completed the libretto and went on to contribute the libretti to Puccini's next three – and most successful – works, La Bohème, Tosca and Madama Butterfly.

Puccini took some musical elements in Manon Lescaut from earlier works he had written. For example, the madrigal Sulla vetta tu del monte from act 2 echoes the Agnus Dei from his 1880 Messa a quattro voci. Other elements of Manon Lescaut come from his compositions for strings: the quartet Crisantemi (January 1890), three Menuets (probably 1884) and a Scherzo (1883?). The love theme comes from the aria Mentia l'avviso (1883).

Performance history
Puccini's publisher, Ricordi, had been against any project based on Prévost's story because Jules Massenet had already made it into a successful opera, Manon, in 1884. While Puccini and Ricordi may not have known it, the French composer Daniel Auber had also already written an opera on the same subject with the title Manon Lescaut, in 1856.

Despite all the warnings, Puccini proceeded. "Manon is a heroine I believe in and therefore she cannot fail to win the hearts of the public. Why shouldn't there be two operas about Manon? A woman like Manon can have more than one lover." He added, "Massenet feels it as a Frenchman, with powder and minuets. I shall feel it as an Italian, with a desperate passion."

The first performance of Manon Lescaut took place in the Teatro Regio in Turin on 1 February 1893; it was Puccini's third opera and his first great success. The opera was first performed at the Metropolitan Opera in New York on 18 January 1907 in the presence of the composer with Lina Cavalieri in the title role, Enrico Caruso as des Grieux, Antonio Scotti as Lescaut, and Arturo Vigna conducting.

Roles

Synopsis
Time: The second half of the eighteenth century.
Places: Amiens, Paris, Le Havre, New Orleans.

Act 1 
Amiens: A large public square near the Paris Gate

Off the square is an Avenue on one side and an Inn on the other, with a balcony. It is evening, townspeople, soldiers and a crowd of male students and girls stroll through the avenue and square while others gather in groups. Some are seated at the tables outside the Inn, drinking and gambling.

Edmondo sings a song of youthful pleasure (Edmondo, chorus of students, girls and townspeople: Ave, sera gentile – Hail gentle evening). Des Grieux enters, and they greet him, but he is melancholic and does not join the others, singing cynically of love (des Grieux, Edmondo, chorus: L'amor?, L'amor? ...io non conosco! – Love?, Love?...I know nothing of that). They joke with him and provoke him to feign flirtation with the girls (des Grieux: Tra voi, belle, brune e bionde – Among you beauties, dark and fair); (Edmondo, chorus: Ma, bravo!).

A postillion horn is heard and the carriage from Arras pulls up at the Inn, as the crowd peers in to see who the passengers are (Chorus: Giunge il cocchio d'Arras! – Here comes the Arras coach!) Lescaut (Manon's brother), then an elderly treasurer-general, Geronte di Ravoir, descend from the coach, Geronte helping Manon, then the remainder of the passengers. The crowd comments (Chorus, Edmondo, Lescaut, des Grieux, Geronte: Discendono, vediam! – Look, they are getting down!) Edmondo and the students admire Manon (Chi non darebbe a quella donnina bella? – Who would not give to that beautiful young woman?). Des Grieux is also smitten (Dio, quanto è bella! – Dear God, such beauty!). The other passengers enter the Inn, while Lescaut signals Manon to wait for him. She sits, as des Grieux, who has been fixated on her, approaches her and declares his feelings for her (des Grieux, Manon,: Cortese damigella – Gentle lady), only to learn she is destined for a convent at the will of her father. He offers to help her, and when Lescaut calls her he begs her to meet him later; she reluctantly agrees. After Manon leaves, des Grieux sings of his feelings for her (des Grieux: Donna non vidi mai – Never before have I beheld a woman such as this). The students and girls, who have been observing the couple, comment mockingly on his good fortune (Edmondo, students: La tua ventura ci rassicura – Your good fortune encourages us).

Lescaut and Geronte descend and converse in the square about Manon's fate, observed by Edmondo. Geronte, who also is captivated by Manon, says she would be wasted in a convent. On hearing his fellow traveller's opinion, Lescaut begins to reconsider his task of escorting his sister to the convent. The students invite Lescaut to join in their card game. Geronte observes that Lescaut is preoccupied with the game and discloses his plan to abduct Manon and take her to Paris to the Innkeeper, offering him money for assistance and his silence. Edmondo overhears the plan and informs des Grieux (Edmondo: Cavaliere, te la fanno! – Sir, they are outwitting you!). He offers to help des Grieux, arranging for the card players to keep Lescaut occupied.

Manon slips out of the inn to meet des Grieux as promised (Manon: Vedete? Io son fedele alla parola mia – You see? I am faithful to my word). He declares his love for her and advises her of the plot to abduct her, while Edmondo arranges for the carriage Geronte has hired to take the couple to Paris. They leave together just as Geronte arrives, ready to execute his plans (Geronte: Di sedur la sorellina e il momento! – The moment to seduce the little sister has arrived). Geronte is taunted by Edmondo. Realising he has been tricked, Geronte urges Lescaut to follow the departed pair. The more pragmatic Lescaut advises him that the pair will soon run out of money, and then Manon will be his.

Act 2
A room in Geronte's house in Paris

(Puccini omits the part of the novel in which Manon and des Grieux live together for a few months, and Manon leaves des Grieux when his money has run out.)

Manon is now Geronte's mistress. Manon and her hairdresser are in the room when Lescaut enters (Manon, Lescaut: Dispettosetto questo riccio!); (Lescaut: Sei splendida e lucente!). She tells him that Geronte is too old and wicked; he bores her. Manon is sad, and her thoughts turn to des Grieux (Manon: In quelle trine morbide); (Lescaut, Manon: Poiché tu vuoi saper).

Musicians hired by Geronte enter to amuse her (Madrigal: Sulla vetta tu del monte); (Manon, Lescaut: Paga costor). Geronte brings a dancing master; they dance a minuet, then she sings a gavotte (Dancing master, Geronte, Manon, chorus: Vi prego, signorina [minuet]); (Manon, Geronte, chorus: L'ora, o Tirsi, è vaga e bella). After dancing, Geronte and the musicians leave the house.

Dismayed that his sister is unhappy living with Geronte, Lescaut goes to find des Grieux. Des Grieux appears in Geronte's house (Manon, des Grieux: Oh, sarò la più bella! – This love's own magic spell). As des Grieux and Manon renew their vows of love, Geronte returns unexpectedly. He salutes the couple, reminding Manon of his many favors to her, including some precious jewels. She replies that she cannot love him (Geronte, des Grieux, Manon: Affè, madamigella).

Bowing low, he leaves them. Manon rejoices in their freedom (Manon: Ah! Ah! Liberi!); (des Grieux: "Ah, manon, mi tradisce il tuo folle pensiero). Lescaut urges them to leave the house at once, but Manon hesitates at the thought of leaving her jewels and pretty frocks. Again, Lescaut enters in breathless haste, making signs that they must depart immediately. Manon snatches up her jewels, and they go to the door. It has been locked by Geronte's order. Soldiers appear to arrest Manon who, in trying to escape, drops the jewels at Geronte's feet. She is dragged away and des Grieux is not permitted to follow her (des Grieux, Manon, Lescaut, sergeant, Geronte: Lescaut! – Tu qui?).

(Intermezzo: The journey to Le Havre.)

His various efforts to have Manon released and even to free her by force having failed, des Grieux follows her to Le Havre.

Act 3
A square near the harbor in Le Havre

At dawn Manon is with the other imprisoned courtesans (des Grieux, Lescaut, Manon: Ansia eterna, crudel). Lescaut has bribed a guard to let des Grieux speak with Manon. Talking to her through the bars, he learns that she is to be deported to Louisiana. A lamplighter passes, singing a song as he extinguishes the lights (Lamplighter, des Grieux, Manon: E Kate ripose al re); (des Grieux, Manon: Manon, disperato è il mio prego).

They attempt a rescue, but in vain. The guard appears, escorting a group of women, who are going on the same ship as Manon. She walks among them, pale and sad. The crowd makes brutal comments during the roll call of the courtesans (Chorus, Lescaut, des Grieux, Manon: All'armi! All'armi!), but Lescaut inspires pity for Manon (Sergeant, chorus, Lescaut, Manon, des Grieux: Rosetta! – Eh, che aria!).

Des Grieux, in despair at the idea of being separated from Manon forever, goes to her side. He tries to seize her but is pushed away by the sergeant. However, the captain of the ship sees his intense grief (des Grieux: Pazzo son!) and allows him to board the ship.

Act 4

A vast plain near the outskirts of the New Orleans territory

Having fled the jealous intrigues of New Orleans, the lovers make their way across a desert to seek refuge in a British settlement. (Modern day Louisiana, however, has no desert. This probably refers to Louisiana (New France)) Wandering in the desert, the ailing Manon is exhausted. She falls and cannot go any farther (des Grieux, Manon: Tutta su me ti posa); (des Grieux: Vedi, son io che piango); (Manon, des Grieux: Sei tu che piangi).

Des Grieux is alarmed by Manon's appearance and goes to look for water. While he is gone, Manon recalls her past and muses about her fatal beauty and her fate (Manon: Sola, perduta, abbandonata).

Des Grieux returns, having been unable to find water. Manon bids him a heart-rending farewell, however not before complaining about how her life has not been fair and that she is no longer beautiful. Before dying in his arms Manon asks des Grieux to tell her how beautiful she used to be, and how he must forgive her wrongdoings and faults before she dies, not listening to him repeat how much he loves her and will miss her. Overcome by grief at the death of his vain and selfish lover, des Grieux collapses across her body (Manon, des Grieux: Fra le tue braccia, amore).

Instrumentation
The opera is scored for piccolo (doubling 3rd flute), two flutes, two oboes, cor anglais, two clarinets, bass clarinet, two bassoons, four horns, three trumpets, three trombones, bass tuba, timpani, triangle, drum, tam-tam, bass drum, cymbals, glockenspiel, celesta, harp, and strings, together with offstage flute, offstage cornet, offstage bell, offstage drum, and offstage sleigh bells.

Recordings

References

Bibliography 
 Anthony Tommasini, The New York Times Essential Library of Opera, Times Books (Henry Holt and Company), 2004.
 Julian Budden, Manon Lescaut, Grove Music Online, 2005.
 Giacomo Puccini, Manon Lescaut. Full score. Milan: Ricordi, 1958.

External links

, with Renata Scotto, Plácido Domingo, Metropolitan Opera New York 1980, conductor James Levine

Adaptations of works by Antoine François Prévost
Italian-language operas
Operas by Giacomo Puccini
1893 operas
Operas set in France
Operas set in the United States
Operas based on novels
Operas
Opera world premieres at the Teatro Regio (Turin)
Plays set in New Orleans
Operas set in Paris